Al-Zahra is a Palestinian municipality in the Gaza Governorate, south of Gaza, in the central Gaza Strip. It's the home of the University of Palestine, and Ummah Open University. In 2009, it had a population of 3,085. There were 837 housing units and 237 other buildings in the town.

References

Villages in the Gaza Strip
Municipalities of the State of Palestine